Iloilo International Airport, also known as Iloilo Airport, and as Cabatuan Airport, after the municipality of Cabatuan, Iloilo, where it is located, is the airport serving the province of Iloilo in the Philippines, including its capital city, Iloilo City, the regional center of the Western Visayas region. It opened its doors to commercial traffic on June 14, 2007, after a decade of planning and construction, replacing Mandurriao Airport in Mandurriao, Iloilo City, which had been in service for over seventy years.  As a result, the new airport inherited its IATA and ICAO airport codes, as well as its position as the fourth-busiest airport in the Philippines, from its predecessor. It was the fifth-busiest airport in the Philippines in 2022. It is the first airport in both Western Visayas and the island of Panay to be built to international standards, and it is also considered to be the primary gateway into the region. It is classified as an international airport by the Civil Aviation Authority of the Philippines.

The airport complex consists of a single runway, various administrative and maintenance buildings, waste-sorting and water-treatment facilities, a power-generating station, a cargo terminal, and a main passenger terminal. Its location on the Tomas Confesor Highway, a major highway transversing the island, makes the airport accessible from all parts of Iloilo and Panay by road, while its proximity to the currently defunct Panay Railways network could potentially link the airport to the rest of Panay by rail.

Since it opened in 2007, Iloilo International Airport is one of the largest airports constructed in the Philippines. During its inauguration, former President Gloria Macapagal Arroyo remarked that the airport was the most beautiful and modern in the country and called it a symbol of both political will and economic maturity.

History

The situation at Mandurriao Airport

Prior to the construction of Iloilo International Airport, Iloilo City was served by Mandurriao Airport, located in the Mandurriao district of Iloilo City, which had been in operation since 1937. Though continually expanded in order to accommodate the changing demands of the city throughout much of its history, Iloilo City's rapid urbanization had made this feat impossible by the 1990s. The  terminal building, constructed in 1982 to handle the passenger demands of a single airline, (Philippine Airlines, being the Philippines' aviation monopoly at the time), was unable to cope with the liberalization of the Philippine aviation industry and the subsequent boom in air travel, when as many as four airlines served the airport at the same time and where the passenger terminal needed to have an area of at least  in order to absorb all peak-hour demand.

The airport's problems continued to linger with it into the new millennium. The increasing incidence of terrorism in the Philippines for example forced aviation officials to restrict airport access only to passengers, the sealing of doors and windows at airport terminals being an essential component thereof.  However, the airport's architecture (which took advantage of natural ventilation) and lack of air conditioning made the airport's pre-departure and arrival areas very uncomfortable for passengers to stay in. To counteract this, the Air Transportation Office (the forerunner of the Civil Aviation Authority of the Philippines) installed six air-conditioning units at the pre-departure area. Although the installed units were able to provide a degree of comfort to passengers, the ATO recognized that their efforts were inadequate: in order to effectively provide a comfortable environment for passengers throughout the entire terminal building, twenty-three air conditioners needed to be installed.  Passenger complaints meanwhile were not limited to just the lack of air conditioning: despite the existence of a baggage X-ray machine, passengers flying other airlines were forced to have their baggage manually checked as the machine was ostensibly for the sole use of Philippine Airlines passengers.

In addition to problems with the terminal building, both the airport's location and surrounding infrastructure were the subject of much complaint as well. For one, although some 1,700 cars visited the airport daily, the parking lot had only 129 slots, and could not be expanded any further. The airport complex likewise was located directly alongside major city thoroughfares, in particular the city's main highway, the Tomas Confesor Highway, which complicated the flow of traffic in and around the area. At one point, the ATO, which was already having difficulty managing vehicular traffic around the airport, proposed banning cargo and delivery trucks from passing through the road in front of the terminal building. However, the city government did not respond.

Beset with a myriad of problems, authorities eventually concluded that a new airport had to be built outside the city, selecting the municipality of Cabatuan as the site of the new Iloilo International Airport. The airport's location was also the site of Cabatuan Airfield, a World War II airfield built primarily in Barangay Tiring but also spread out to adjacent Barangays Duyan-Duyan, Gaub, and Tabucan, all located in the same municipality.

Lt. Col. Ryoichi Tozuka, the commander of the Imperial Japanese Army in Panay Island, signed the document of surrender at Cabatuan Airfield, on September 2, 1945, the same day as the surrender signing in Japan aboard the U.S.S. Missouri. This was accepted by Col. Raymond G. Stanton, comdg the 160th U.S. Infantry regiment, and was attended by Rear Admiral Ralph O. Davis, comdg the U.S. Navy's 13th Amphibious Group, and by Brig. Gen. Donald J. Myers, comdg the 40th Infantry Division. The 13th Amphibious Group was tasked to transport the 40th U.S. Infantry Division to Korea.

Planning and construction

In October 1995, the Iloilo city government announced its intention to construct a new airport outside the city in cooperation with the private sector. Although two sites were initially proposed: north of the city in Cabatuan and south of the city in the province of Guimaras, the ATO decided to keep the airport in Iloilo, citing the lack of demand in Guimaras to justify construction there. The Regional Development Council for Western Visayas (RDC) later endorsed the project to the National Economic and Development Authority (NEDA) for its approval in July 1997.

Concurrently with the planning of the new airport, the Japan International Cooperation Agency (JICA) initiated a study on the master planning and long-term development plans of four key domestic airports in the Philippines. The report cited Mandurriao Airport, Bacolod City Domestic Airport, Legazpi Airport and Daniel Z. Romualdez Airport in Tacloban City as these key domestic airports, noting the high growth of passenger and cargo volume there and the eventual need for expansion.  Heeding the recommendations of the JICA report, President Joseph Estrada signed a memorandum in November 1998 creating the Iloilo Airport Coordinating Committee, headed by Iloilo-born senator Franklin Drilon.  The coordinating committee decided that a new airport was needed for Iloilo City as Mandurriao Airport was deemed unexpandable due to operational obstacles and the presence of slums and other natural and civic structures that would restrict expansion efforts.  In addition, the committee, objecting to the idea that the new airport would serve merely as a reliever for the new Bacolod airport, successfully lobbied for an international airport to be built in lieu of a domestic one.  The project finally received NEDA approval in March 2000, with Cabatuan as the location of the new airport based on a study performed by both the DOTC and the JICA later that year.

Although multiple funding sources were originally considered by the NEDA to fund the airport's construction, it was decided that the project should avail of an official development assistance facility offered by the Japanese government through the then-newly formed Japan Bank for International Cooperation (JBIC). After almost two years of negotiations, and after initially refusing to bankroll the project, the JBIC extended a 6.2 billion peso (US$152 million) loan to the Philippine government in August 2000.

The Iloilo International Airport project was inaugurated by President Gloria Macapagal Arroyo on January 25, 2004, and construction work on the new airport started on April 14 that year. The original expected deadline of completion was June 2007, although this was moved to the first quarter of 2007. A joint venture between the Taisei Corporation and the Shimizu Corporation of Japan served as the contractor for the project, with Phil-Japan Airport Consultants, Inc. managing the project and serving as the government's consultant to the project.  The project was 75 percent complete as of July 14, 2006, and fully completed by March 18, 2007. While construction was completed ahead of schedule, the airport was constructed over budget, with a final cost of around 8.8 billion pesos ($201 million) caused by increases in the cost of civil works and consultancy services.

Name

During construction, the airport was officially called the New Iloilo Airport Development Project, or NIADP. However, as the airport was nearing completion, there were three main contenders for the airport's name:  Iloilo International Airport, the original name of the airport which had the support of the Iloilo provincial and city governments;  Panay International Airport, proposed by the President and supported by the RDC, which at the time was led by Antique governor Salvacion Perez; and Graciano Lopez-Jaena International Airport, named after the Iloilo-born Graciano López Jaena, proposed by the Dr. Graciano Lopez-Jaena Foundation with the support of the RDC and Antique governor Perez, who is also a member of the foundation, and endorsed by the National Historical Institute.

Out of the two proposals, the name Panay International Airport was dropped due to opposition by the Iloilo city and provincial governments, the Sangguniang Panlungsod of Iloilo City, the mayor of Cabatuan and Justice Secretary Raul Gonzalez, all citing that it is illogical to rename an airport after an island as large as Panay. Prospects for Graciano Lopez-Jaena International Airport were better, with then Iloilo governor Niel Tupas, Sr. saying that the feasibility of renaming the airport after López Jaena or any other Ilonggo should be studied first.

Local newspaper The News Today issued an informal survey asking Iloilo City residents what should be the name of the airport and why. Although the survey is non-scientific, a plurality of the nineteen respondents suggested that the name be kept as Iloilo International Airport.

More recently, after the opening of the airport, the local government of Cabatuan suggested renaming the airport after Tomas Confesor, a native of Cabatuan who once served as governor of Iloilo, a senator, and is known for being one of the founders of the Boy Scouts of the Philippines. This was opposed by Tupas' successor, Arthur Defensor, Sr., who says that the current name has geographic value.  Opposition to the proposed name change has also come from Senator Drilon, the Iloilo Business Club, and the regional office of the Department of Tourism.

Inauguration and start of operations

Iloilo International Airport was originally scheduled to open on March 19, 2007, when its inaugural flight would land;  however, this was moved to April 16, with commercial operations commencing on April 21.  This date was likewise scrapped due to the inability of the President to attend because of the hospitalization of First Gentleman Jose Miguel Arroyo,  with a new date scheduled for sometime in late April.  Some sources indicated that the airport would open on May 10, 2007, during a major TEAM Unity rally in Iloilo City that President Arroyo was expected to attend,  although this date was not considered in favor of a date after the 2007 elections, specifically in June, in order to avoid political overtones from dominating the airport's opening.  The final date chosen for the airport's inauguration was June 13, 2007, with commercial services commencing the next day.  By that time, airlines had already transferred their offices to the new airport.

The airport was formally opened on June 13 with the arrival of the presidential aircraft at the new airport at around 9:50 am PST, with Governor Tupas leading provincial and city officials in welcoming the President to the new facility. The inauguration of the new airport also included figures such as Japanese ambassador Ryuchiro Yamazaki and Transportation and Communications Secretary Leandro Mendoza, who assisted the President in leading the inaugural rites.  The facility itself was formally commissioned at 5:00 am PST on June 14, coinciding with the simultaneous decommissioning of Mandurriao Airport.  The first commercial flight to land at the new airport was Air Philippines Flight 987, a Boeing 737-200 that departed from Ninoy Aquino International Airport (Manila) and landed at 6:05 am PST the same day.

Operations on the first day of the airport's commercial activity ran smoothly, although a baggage conveyor belt and X-ray machines malfunctioned due to a sudden surge in passengers trying to catch their early morning flights.  Some tension marred the airport's first day after baggage porters who worked at the old airport insisted on working at the new airport.  The ATO, DOTC and the porters have since agreed to a closed-door conference and later on to refer the problem to DOTC Assistant Secretary Eduardo "Red" Kapunan, the person in charge of international airports in the Philippines.

Future expansion and development
Since the opening of Iloilo International Airport, the airport has operated beyond its designed annual capacity of 1.2 million passengers. By 2019, the airport handled more than two million passengers. Plans to expand the airport were laid as early as February 2016, to be implemented under a public-private partnership (PPP) scheme. The project would have cost  and would involve the expansion of the passenger terminal and other facilities. It also included a 30-year concession contract to operate and maintain the airport.

However, no new reports surfaced until expansion plans were restarted in December 2018, when the Villar Group of businessman and former senator Manny Villar submitted an unsolicited proposal to operate, maintain, and expand the airport. The Civil Aviation Authority of the Philippines granted the original proponent status to the proposal in May 2019.

Another plan was announced in October 2022, when the Department of Transportation announced the airport's inclusion on the list of airports in the PPP pipeline for the upgrading and expansion of airports. By December 2022, the airport's supervisor asserted the need for expansion, as the passenger terminal operates again beyond its designed capacity as travel demand returns to its pre-COVID-19 pandemic levels.

Structure

Runway

The runway runs at a direction of 02°/20°, the same as Mandurriao Airport. However, unlike the runway at Mandurriao, the longer runway at Iloilo International Airport can support widebodied aircraft such as the Airbus A330, Airbus A340, Airbus A350 XWB, Airbus A380, Boeing 777 (with reduced payload for the -300 series or -200 series), Boeing 767, Boeing 757, Antonov An-124 Ruslan, McDonnell Douglas MD-11, Boeing 787. This was proven when an Airbus A310 and a Boeing C-17 Globemaster III (designated as an Airbus CC-150 Polaris and CC-177 Globemaster III, respectively) belonging to the Royal Canadian Air Force, landed at the airport to deploy Canadian troops for relief operations in the wake of Typhoon Haiyan.

Runway lights and an Instrument Landing System were installed, making the airport capable of supporting low-visibility and night landings under any weather conditions.

Terminals

Passenger terminal

The airport has a  main passenger terminal designed to accommodate around 1.2 million passengers annually. Regarded as one of the most beautifully designed airport terminals in the Philippines, its architectural style is said to be reminiscent of Hong Kong International Airport, albeit on a smaller scale. It is divided into three levels: arrivals and baggage claim on the first floor, check-in on the second floor and departures on the third floor. The pre-departure area at Iloilo International Airport has a capacity of 436 passengers. Three jet bridges protrude from the terminal above a  apron, enabling Iloilo International Airport to handle up to six aircraft simultaneously.

The terminal is equipped with six X-ray machines, as well as escalators and staircases for departing and arriving passengers' use.  There are also two elevators, one for very important persons and one for disabled passengers.  Two pocket gardens have been installed at the terminal, one each for both the departure and arrival halls.  The building features ten modern check-in counters with LCD monitors.  The terminal makes extensive use of natural lighting, designed for energy efficiency. Other amenities available to passengers include a special smoking room, a duty-free shop, a VIP lounge, a Mabuhay Lounge for Philippine Airlines business class passengers and counters for hotel and car rental bookings, as well as areas for airport stores and payphones.

On August 5, 2016, the CAAP launched the airport's free wireless Internet network, in cooperation with PLDT and Smart Communications.

Cargo terminal
The three-storey building, built in an architectural style similar to that of the main terminal building, has a covered platform, bathrooms, government offices and cargo handling areas, as well as its own parking lot. Airline offices also occupy the structure, secured by means of a perimeter fence with a guard house.

Other structures

A briefing room for pilots is found inside the control tower. Additionally, the airport complex has a fire station equipped with three fire trucks, a maintenance building, a mechanical building and an administrative building. In front of the passenger terminal is a 415-slot parking lot for the use of passengers, employees and airport visitors.

The airport has a power back-up system and a power generating station that enables the airport to run in the event of a power outage, returning the supply of electric power to the facility within three seconds.  The airport has water treatment facilities and a  man-made pond used for flood control and drainage purposes as well as for the irrigation of nearby farmland.  A waste treatment and sorting facility on the airport grounds converts solid waste into fertilizer for the use of surrounding farms.

Airlines and destinations

Having previously served commercial international flights, international flights to and from the airport have been suspended since March 2020 due to the COVID-19 pandemic.

In 2011, Iloilo International Airport serviced an average of 42 flights daily on four domestic routes.  At the time of its opening, the ATO believed that international flights out of and to the airport might not begin until 2008, although international passenger flights could commence once Iloilo International Airport meets ICAO standards.  A study was conducted on the feasibility of the airport serving international flights, and the CAAP announced that year that the airport met ICAO standards, allowing for international flights to land at the airport.

The DOTC plans to stage international cargo flights out of the airport, as sixty percent of Philippine seafood exports come from Panay. Japan and Hong Kong have been cited as potential first destinations of these cargo flights.

On January 31, 2008, the Iloilo city government announced that Cebu Pacific was considering starting international services from Iloilo, initially with a route to Hong Kong to cater to the large number of Overseas Filipinos there.  Philippine Airlines later announced its intent to serve this route as well, suggesting that Iloilo tourism authorities mount thrice-weekly charter flights to the city using PAL Airbus A320 aircraft.  City government officials also believed that the opening of a Cathay Pacific office in Iloilo City may bode well for future service to Hong Kong. In addition to Hong Kong flights, the Center for Research and Communication of the University of Asia and the Pacific has called for flights from Iloilo City to Japan, South Korea and mainland China.  The first international flight from Iloilo International Airport departed on November 8, 2012, to Hong Kong.

PAL Express, a subsidiary of Philippine Airlines, once considered a direct route from Iloilo to Malay to boost Boracay-bound tourism traffic.  A resolution passed by the Iloilo City Local Development Council (ICLDC) called on PAL president Jaime Bautista to institute direct flights to Malay from Iloilo, with onward service to Cebu City on the return portion from Malay.  However, PAL has questioned the route's feasibility, citing congestion at Godofredo P. Ramos Airport which serves that municipality.  Nearly ten years after initial service was discussed, on March 20, 2017, leisure carrier Air Juan became the first airline to launch scheduled service between the two airports, as well as launching additional service to Cuyo in Palawan, and supplementary service to Sipalay in Negros Occidental.

Statistics

Data from Civil Aviation Authority of the Philippines (CAAP).

An em dash (—) is used if data from CAAP is not available.

Access and transportation

Road

Iloilo International Airport is connected to Iloilo City proper via the Tomas Confesor Highway. The access road is wide enough to be able to accommodate four lanes of traffic. The estimated travel time to the airport from Iloilo City proper is around thirty minutes.

To relieve crowding on the main access road during peak hours, a  secondary access road was constructed, connecting the airport to Cabatuan proper through Barangay Duyan-Duyan. The 124 million-peso ($2.6 million) road is expected to improve connectivity between the airport and both northern Iloilo and southern Capiz, as well as reduce travel times from there to the airport by at least fifteen minutes.  The two-lane road opened in July 2010.

Public transportation
When the airport opened in 2007, no franchises for transport services to the airport have been granted yet by the Land Transportation Franchising and Regulatory Board (LTFRB), although public transport routes to and from the airport were being studied.  Some transport operators, however, have expressed interest in starting shuttle services to the airport from Iloilo City, while others have drawn proposals for public transport routes from Iloilo City directly to the airport. A shuttle service is currently available to the airport from Iloilo City, with pick-up and drop-off points at SM City Iloilo and Jaro Plaza. Aside from shuttle services, P2P buses can be used by travelers going to Iloilo Business Park and vice versa, which was launched July 2019.

Taxi cabs in Iloilo may be hired to get from the airport to Iloilo City Proper or vice versa. The taxi drivers will most likely opt for a fixed rate rather than using the taxi meter. The taxi fare going to the airport from Iloilo City Proper range between 350 and 400 pesos as of 2016.

Iloilo International Airport is accessible via jeepney to Santa Barbara town proper, after which travelers may take a share taxi to the airport. Travelers may also take jeepneys en route to Cabatuan, Calinog or Janiuay, all of which stop at Santa Barbara.

Rail
A train linking Iloilo International Airport to Iloilo City proper, similar to the Airport Express in Hong Kong and similar systems in other cities, has been proposed.  A study to determine the feasibility of a train service has since been commissioned by the city government.  Other proposals to connect the airport to the city via rail include the revival of the currently defunct Panay Railways network which has a station in Santa Barbara town proper.

Accidents and incidents
On October 13, 2017, Cebu Pacific Air Flight 461 (registration RP-C3237) overran the runway on landing after a flight from Ninoy Aquino International Airport. All 180 passengers plus the crew safely evacuated the aircraft. As the airport was closed in order to tow the incident aircraft to the tarmac, flights serving the Manila-Iloilo-Manila and Iloilo-Cebu-Iloilo routes were diverted to Roxas Airport. Mactan–Cebu International Airport became the diversion airport for the Iloilo-Hong Kong-Iloilo flights.

See also

 Mandurriao Airport

References

External links

 www.IloiloInternationalAirport.com -Iloilo International Airport Flight Status and Updates
 IloiloAirport.com -The New Iloilo Airport at Cabatuan, Iloilo
 

Airports in the Philippines
Buildings and structures in Iloilo
Transportation in Iloilo
Airports established in 2007
Iloilo City